USS Diver (ARS-5) was a Diver-class rescue and salvage ship commissioned by the U.S. Navy for service in World War II. She was responsible for coming to the aid of stricken vessels.

Diver (ARS-5) was launched 19 December 1942 by Basalt Rock Company in Napa, California; sponsored by Mrs. F. M. Young; and commissioned 23 October 1943.

World War II North Atlantic operations 
 
Diver arrived at Falmouth, England, from Norfolk, Virginia, 15 February 1944. After 3 days of salvage training operations at Rosneath Bay, Scotland, she reported to Portland, England, 27 March, for preparations for the coming invasion of Normandy.

Assisting during the Normandy invasion 

On 26 June she got underway for Baie de la Seine, France, where she was attached to the Salvage, Wreck Disposal, Mine Disposal, and Hydrographic Survey Unit. She rescued 30 survivors of the Norwegian freighter SS Norfolk, sunk by mine while on her way to Cherbourg on 20 July and 21 July, then reported for salvage operations at Utah beach and Omaha beach. She arrived at Le Havre 11 November to continue her salvage work. Sailing to aid a torpedoed British transport 28 December Diver struck an unmarked submerged obstacle and returned to Le Havre for emergency repairs. Permanent repairs were made at Dieppe, from 6 January to 21 January 1945, after which Diver returned to Le Havre to continue her salvage work.

Duty in Germany 
 
Diver sailed for Bremerhaven, Germany, 15 June 1945, by way of Ostend, Belgium, and Den Helder, the Netherlands. From her arrival 22 June she served as guard, ready duty, salvage, and local escort vessel. On 23 August she moved to Brake, Germany, to stand by for any damage to shipping in the Weser River. She left Bremerhaven 4 October with 41 naval passengers and arrived at Norfolk, Virginia, 22 October for overhaul.

Clearing New York harbor 
 
From 9 February to 16 February 1946, Diver was at New York to assist in relieving the harbor congestion caused by a tugboat strike. She served on towing duty between New London, Connecticut, and Portsmouth, New Hampshire, from 18 April to 13 May.

Post-war decommissioning 

On 27 May she arrived at Orange, Texas, where she was decommissioned, 27 July 1946. Diver was sold 12 April 1949.

Military awards and honors 
 
Diver received one battle star for World War II service:
 Invasion of Normandy
Her crew was eligible for the following medals:
 American Campaign Medal
 Europe-Africa-Middle East Campaign Medal
 World War II Victory Medal

References

External links 
 
  Basalt Rock Company Shipbuilding History

 

Diver-class rescue and salvage ships
Ships built in Napa, California
World War II auxiliary ships of the United States
1942 ships